Nancagua is a Chilean city and commune in Colchagua Province, O'Higgins Region.

Demographics
Of these, 9,264 (59.3%) lived in urban areas and 6,370 (40.7%) in rural areas. The population grew by 8.5% (1,220 persons) between the 1992 and 2002 censuses.

Administration
As a commune, Nancagua is a third-level administrative division of Chile administered by a municipal council, headed by an alcalde who is directly elected every four years. The 2021-2024 alcalde is Mario Bustamante.

References

External links

  Municipality of Nancagua

Communes of Chile
Populated places in Colchagua Province